After the Storm is a 1928 American silent drama film directed by George B. Seitz. A print of the film exists at the Cinematheque Royale de Belgique.

Cast
 Hobart Bosworth as Manin Dane
 Eugenia Gilbert as Joan Wells / Mary Brian
 Charles Delaney as Joe Dane
 Maude George as Molly O'Doon
 George Kuwa as A. Hop
 Linda Loredo as Malay Dancer

References

External links

1928 films
1928 drama films
Silent American drama films
American silent feature films
American black-and-white films
Films directed by George B. Seitz
Columbia Pictures films
1920s American films
1920s English-language films